Bee Cheng Hiang (in English "Beauty-Flavor-Aroma") is a Singaporean company that produces Chinese-style foodstuffs, especially that of Singaporean cuisine. Starting as a market stall in 1933 in Singapore, the company has expanded its operations beyond Singapore to more than 370 retail outlets located in 72 cities, across 13 territories — Mainland China, Hong Kong, Macau, Taiwan, South Korea, Indonesia, Malaysia, Japan, Vietnam, and the Philippines.

Its best-known product is bakkwa—smoked and roasted pieces of pork with a consistency similar to jerky. Bee Cheng Hiang introduced "Gourmet Bakkwa" in 2003 (which is bacon-like slices of bakkwa), and, in 2005, the "Chilli Gourmet Bakkwa". Over the years the company has expanded its offerings to include prawn rolls, crispy pork floss, cuttlefish, and sausages, etc.

Overseas Expansion 

 Opened first outlet In Malaysia in 1985
 Opened first outlet In Hong Kong in 1992
 Opened first outlet In Indonesia in 1996 
 Opened first outlet In Taiwan in 2000 
 Opened first outlet In China in 2002
 Opened first outlet In South Korea in 2010 
 Opened first outlet In Macau in 2012 
 Opened first outlet In Thailand in 2015 
 Opened first outlet in Japan in 2016 
 Opened first outlet in Cambodia in 2018

References

External links

Official website of Bee Cheng Hiang

Food and drink companies established in 1933
Food manufacturers of Singapore
1933 establishments in Singapore
Singaporean brands